People Like Us is a 1980 Australian film about five families living in the western suburbs of Sydney. It was the pilot for a TV series that did not eventuate.

References

External links

Australian television films
1980 television films
1980 films
1980s English-language films